Afterlife is a 2004 live album by Joe Jackson. It contains recordings from performances on 27 August 2003 at The Fillmore in San Francisco, CA, at House of Blues on 28 August in Los Angeles CA and on 29 August in Anaheim CA, and ultimately, on 31 August 2003 in San Diego CA at 4th and B.

For these recording Jackson re-united with the musicians from his first successes: Graham Maby, Gary Sanford and Dave Houghton. As he made television appearances to promote the album, Jackson insisted that the quartet's reunion had been a one-off.

His recording of "Steppin' Out" was used in a television advertisement for Lincoln-Mercury automobiles.

Track listing 
All songs written and arranged by Joe Jackson, except where noted.

Personnel 
 Musicians
 Joe Jackson – keyboards, melodica, vocals
 Graham Maby – bass, vocals
 David Houghton – drums, vocals
 Gary Sanford – guitar, vocals

 Production
 Joe Jackson - arrangements, producer
 Julie Gardner - recording engineer, mixing engineer
 Ray Staff - mastering engineer
 Paul Smith - mixing engineer
 Frank Orlinsky - art direction
 Tom Sheehan - photography

References

External links 
 Afterlife album information at The Joe Jackson Archive

Joe Jackson (musician) live albums
2004 live albums
Rykodisc live albums